100 points is a term that holds differing significance in various sports. The following are some of the distinctions this phrase may refer to:

List of basketball players who have scored 100 points in a single game, a rare achievement
Wilt Chamberlain's 100-point game, the only occurrence of a 100-point game in the National Basketball Association (NBA)
List of 100-point games in college football, American college football
List of NHL players with 100-point seasons, National Hockey League (NHL)
Century break, scoring 100 points or more within one turn in the game of snooker

Other uses
100 point check, an outcome of the Australian Commonwealth Government's desire to limit opportunities for individuals and companies to hide financial transaction fraud

See also